The Flaw may refer to:

 The Flaw (1933 film), a British thriller film
 The Flaw (1955 film), a British crime film

See also
 
 The Flaws, an Irish music group
 Flaw (disambiguation)